DE9 may refer to:
 DE-9, a common type of electrical connector
 Decks, EFX & 909, a 1999 album by Canadian Detroit techno artist Richie Hawtin
 DE9: Closer to the Edit, a 2001 album by Canadian Detroit techno artist Richie Hawtin
 DE9: Transitions, a 2005 album by Canadian Detroit techno artist Richie Hawtin
 DE9: Fragments, a 2012 recorded performance by Canadian Detroit techno artist Richie Hawtin
 Delaware Route 9